Sundar Krishna Urs (1941–1993) was an Indian film producer and actor, in the Kannada film industry, as well as in many South Indian language films. He has also worked as a dubbing artist providing voices to many actors. Some of the notable films of Sundar Krishna Urs as an actor include Sangya Balya (1992), Hrudaya Haadithu (1991), Hendthighelbedi (1989), Antha (1981).

Awards

Career
Sundar Krishna Urs has been part of more than 190 movies in Kannada. He also directed a teen adventure movie called Supernova 459, which also happens to be his last acting credit before his death.

Selected filmography

See also

List of people from Karnataka
Cinema of Karnataka
List of Indian film actors
Cinema of India

References

External links

Indian male film actors
Kannada male actors
Male actors in Tamil cinema
Male actors in Kannada cinema
Male actors from Karnataka
20th-century Indian male actors
21st-century Indian male actors
1941 births
1993 deaths